The McGuigan Harrison Athletic Club, also known as McGuigan's Arena or The Casino, was a popular sports and social club in Harrison, NJ in the early 1900s owned by NJ Hall of Fame boxer and promoter Paddy McGuigan. The club was used primarily to host boxing matches, but also hosted dances and other functions.

Fight records 

McGuigan opened his club after the conclusion of his boxing career, which may have gone well into his 50s.  Sometimes referred to as Old Paddy McGuigan's "Bucket of Blood," the club was a widely popular venue for at least 18 years, based on dates found in surviving fight records.

Fights at the club were regularly followed by the Newark Evening News and the Newark Star-Eagle.

|align="center" colspan=9|Surviving Records

|-
| align="center" style="border-style: none none solid solid; background: #e3e3e3"|Date
| align="center" style="border-style: none none solid solid; background: #e3e3e3"|Boxer
| align="center" style="border-style: none none solid solid; background: #e3e3e3"|Weight
| align="center" style="border-style: none none solid solid; background: #e3e3e3"|Opponent
| align="center" style="border-style: none none solid solid; background: #e3e3e3"|Weight
| align="center" style="border-style: none none solid solid; background: #e3e3e3"|Result
| align="center" style="border-style: none none solid solid; background: #e3e3e3"|Rounds
| align="center" style="border-style: none none solid solid; background: #e3e3e3"|Type
| align="center" style="border-style: none none solid solid; background: #e3e3e3"|Notes
|-align=center
|10-13-1910||Dave Kurtz||||Charley Smith||||Win||10||News||
|-align=center
|11-17-1910||Dave Kurtz||||Frank Kenny||||Draw||10||News||
|-align=center
|01-03-1911||Hank Griffin||||"Dutch" Zimmer||||Win||3||KO||
|-align=center
|01-03-1911||Hank Griffin||||Jack McCargo||||Win||5||UNK||
|-align=center
|01-03-1911||Hank Griffin||||Bull Anderson||||UNK||UNK||UNK||
|-align=center
|01-16-1911||Valentine "Knockout" Brown||||Jack Ritchie||||Win||2||KO||
|-align=center
|02-06-1911||Battling Hurley||||Tony Bender||||Win||10||News||
|-align=center
|03-11-1911||Angelo "Young Foster" Venizona||||William Kennedy||||UNK||4||UNK||
|-align=center
|02-04-1918||Allentown Joe Gans||||Willie Gradwell||||Win||8||News||
|-align=center
|02-25-1918||Allentown Joe Gans||||Lew Cardell||||Draw||8||News||
|-align=center
|12-09-1918||Jackie Sharkey||||Harold Farese||||Loss||8||News||
|-align=center
|12-23-1918||Phil Krug||||Bobby Gleason||||Draw||8||News||
|-align=center
|03-19-1919||Jackie Sharkey||||Patsy Johnson||||Win||8||News||
|-align=center
|04-14-1919||Ed Kinley||||Battling Levinsky||||Loss||8||News||
|-align=center
|05-20-1919||Charley Weinert||||Ed Williams||||Win||2||TKO||
|-align=center
|10-27-1919||Phil Krug||||Ed Kinley||||Win||8||News||
|-align=center
|12-19-1919||Mickey Walker||139 lbs||Young Thompson||||Win||5||TKO||
|-align=center
|05-03-1920||Bobby Gleason||||Allentown Joe Gans||||Win||12||News||
|-align=center
|12-06-1921||Allentown Joe Gans||||Panama Joe Gans||||Loss||12||News||
|-align=center
|10-09-1922||Spencer Gardner||||Willie Murphy||||Win||12||News||
|-align=center
|10-09-1922||Oliver Gardner||||Johnny Dixon||||Loss||6||News||
|-align=center
|10-16-1922||Red Chapman||||Jimmy Freda||||Win||12||News||
|-align=center
|10-16-1922||Billy Vidabeck||||Willie Applegate||||Win||6||News||
|-align=center
|10-23-1922||Red Chapman||||Spencer Gardner||||Win||12||News||
|-align=center
|11-14-1922||Spencer Gardner||||Tommy Gerrard||||Win||12||News||
|-align=center
|12-07-1922||Red Chapman||||Spencer Gardner||||Win||10||News||
|-align=center
|01-25-1923||Willie Herman||138.5 lbs||Marty Mandeville||140 lbs||Win||3||TKO||
|-align=center
|01-25-1923||Panama Billy Walker||138 lbs||Bobby Morris||140 lbs||Win||8||News||
|-align=center
|01-25-1923||Snowball Moore||148 lbs||Battling Walker||141 lbs||Loss||6||News||
|-align=center
|01-25-1923||Joe Barry||116.5 lbs||Eddie West||116.25 lbs||Loss||4||News||
|-align=center
|01-25-1923||Clyde Jones||131 lbs||Young Ross||133 lbs||Draw||4||News||
|-align=center
|01-25-1923||Charley Murray||127.5 lbs||Kid Callahan||128.15 lbs||Draw||4||News||
|-align=center
|02-01-1923||Lew Seltzer||146.5 lbs||Young Banne||143.5 lbs||Win||8||News||
|-align=center
|02-01-1923||Johnny Ryan||138 lbs||Joe Bean||135 lbs||Win||4||News||
|-align=center
|02-01-1923||Charley Reed||136.5 lbs||Kid Beans||135 lbs||Win||4||News||
|-align=center
|02-01-1923||Joe Ross||133.5 lbs||Lew Farrell||132.5 lbs||Win||2||TKO||
|-align=center
|02-01-1923||Johnny Dixon||126 lbs||Artie Gold||124 lbs||Win||4||News||
|-align=center
|02-13-1923||Tommy Stapleton||||Bert Smithers||||Win||8||KO||
|-align=center
|02-13-1923||Joe O'Brien||||Mickey Griffin||||Loss||4||News||
|-align=center
|02-20-1923||Battling Johnson||||Joe Senter||||Cancelled||0||X||
|-align=center
|04-03-1923||Billy Moore||||Jim Halliday||||Scheduled||UNK||UNK||
|-align=center
|04-03-1923||Mickey Lebor||||Johnny Dixon||||Scheduled||UNK||UNK||
|-align=center
|04-24-1923||Willie Crystal||||Jack McFarland||||Loss||12||News||
|-align=center
|04-24-1923||Larry Estridge||||James Thomas||||Win||1||KO||
|-align=center
|05-10-1923||Ray Pryel||||Jimmy Duffy||||Scheduled||12||UNK||
|-align=center
|05-21-1923||Billy White||||Jack Ritchie||||Win||6||News||
|-align=center
|05-21-1923||Joey Russell||||Frankie Mason||||Win||4||News||
|-align=center
|06-07-1923||Joey Russell||||Patsy Moore||||Win||1||TKO||
|-align=center
|06-28-1923||Leo Gates||||Bill Holliday||||Scheduled||12||UNK||
|-align=center
|08-09-1923||George Mulholland||||Jackie Brown||||Scheduled||UNK||UNK||
|-align=center
|09-06-1923||Jack Rappaport||140 lbs||Shamus O'Brien||144 lbs||Loss||12||News||
|-align=center
|02-11-1924||Mickey Walters||||Charley Traino||||Win||10||News|| 
|-align=center
|02-05-1925||Benny Tressito||||Philly Griffin||||Loss||6||News||
|-align=center
|02-05-1925||Sollie Castellane||||Bobby Rinker||||Win||1||KO||
|-align=center
|02-05-1925||Jack Stone||||Sid Kelly||||Win||3||KO||
|-align=center
|02-05-1925||Sammy Tucker||||Matty DiSantis||||Win||UNK||News||
|-align=center
|06-12-1925||Nate Isaacson||||Steve Samsky||||Win||UNK||News||
|-align=center
|06-19-1925||Charley Wells||||Nick Resa||||Win||4||News||
|-align=center
|06-30-1925||Willie Ferguson||||Jimmy Britt||||Win||1||KO||
|-align=center
|06-30-1925||Midget Herman||||Nick Carter||||Win||6||TKO||
|-align=center
|07-09-1925||Larry Roach||||Kid Leon||||Win||1||KO||
|-align=center
|07-09-1925||Bobby Morris||||Whitney Miller||||Win||8||News||
|-align=center
|07-17-1925||Benny Tressito||||Philly Griffin||||Loss||6||News||
|-align=center
|07-17-1925||Abie Bain||||Willie Ferguson||||Win||3||KO||
|-align=center
|07-17-1925||Joe Harbelt||||Dal Hawkins||||Win||6||News||
|-align=center
|09-11-1925||Nate Isaacson||||Sailor Joe Downey||||Win||10||News||
|-align=center
|03-26-1926||Buddy Dawson||||Sollie Castellane||||Loss||8||News||
|-align=center
|07-09-1926||Sammy Tucker||||Sammy Parker||||Win||1||KO||
|-align=center
|08-20-1926||Sailor Darden||145 lbs||Joe Moresco||142 lbs||Win||10||News||
|-align=center
|09-14-1926||Abie Bain||||Sailor Darden||||Loss||10||News||
|-align=center
|09-14-1926||Phil Krug||||Danny Fagan||||Win||10||News||
|-align=center
|09-14-1926||Joey Russell||||Babe Adams||||Win||8||News||
|-align=center|09-14-1926||Joey Russel||||Babe Adams||||Win||8||News||
|-align=center
|09-14-1926||Lenny Banks||||Billy Devoe||||Win||1||TKO|||
|-align=center
|08-27-1928||Tony Galento||||James Jay Lawless||||Loss||5||DQ||
|-align=center

Controversy
On March 4, 1911, a boy boxer named Angelo "Young Foster" Venizona died after being hospitalized due to injuries sustained in a bout with boxer William Kennedy at McGuigan's club the previous night. Reportedly, the match ended without a knockdown or knockout after four rounds and both competitors shook hands in the dressing room. Shortly afterwards, Venizona fell backwards onto the ground while sitting on a railing inside the club. A physician instructed Venizona to be taken home after evaluating him. After a confrontation between the boy's father and the men who took him home regarding the source of his injury, Venizona was taken to the City Hospital in Newark. Harrison detectives ruled that Venizona's death was caused by a blood clot at the base of his brain due to a blow to the head sustained during the match, which may have also caused him to fall off of the railing afterwards. Kennedy was arrested and charged with manslaughter. McGuigan and two other men were arrested and charged with aiding and abetting, arraigned in the Harrison Police Courts, and taken to the Hudson County Courthouse. McGuigan was released on $500 bail, while the two others were held as material witnesses. Upon receiving a letter from the case prosecutor, Harrison's Chief of Police notified McGuigan that boxing matches would no longer be permitted at the club. It is unknown how this ban was resolved or circumvented, as bouts continued to take place at the club for at least the following 15 years.

References 

Defunct indoor arenas in the United States
Boxing clubs in the United States
Defunct boxing venues in the United States
Defunct sports venues in New Jersey
Boxing venues in New Jersey
Indoor arenas in New Jersey
Harrison, New Jersey
Sports in Hudson County, New Jersey